A corf (pl. corves)  also spelt corve (pl. corves) in mining is a wicker basket or a small human powered (in later times in the case of the larger mines, horse drawn) minecart for carrying or transporting coal, ore, etc. Human powered corfs had generally been phased out by the turn of the 20th century, with horse drawn corfs having been mostly replaced by horse drawn or motorised minecarts mounted on rails by the late 1920s. Also similar is a Tram, originally a box on runners, dragged like a sledge.

Origin of term 

1350–1400;  Middle English from Dutch and German Korb, ultimately borrowed from Latin corbis  basket; cf. corbeil.

Survivors
The National Coal Mining Museum for England has a hazel basket type Corf from William Pit near Whitehaven.

See also 
Corf (fishing)
Minecart
 Mineral wagon
Mines and Collieries Act 1842

References

External links 

Mining equipment
History of mining in the United Kingdom
Weaving
Wagons
Human-powered vehicles
Animal-powered vehicles
History of the British Isles
Traditional mining
Underground mining